Jeffrey de Lange (born 1 April 1998) is a Dutch professional footballer who plays as a goalkeeper for Dutch club Go Ahead Eagles.

Career
De Lange is a youth product of Ajax, and began his career as the reserve goalkeeper at Jong Ajax. On 14 April 2017, he transferred to FC Twente. He made his professional debut with Twente in a 3–1 KNVB Cup loss to De Graafschap on 27 October 2020.

On 15 June 2022, de Lange signed a three-year deal with Go Ahead Eagles.

References

External links
 
 Ons Oranje Profile

1998 births
Living people
Sportspeople from Amstelveen
Dutch footballers
Netherlands youth international footballers
Association football goalkeepers
AFC Ajax players
Jong Ajax players
FC Twente players
Go Ahead Eagles players
Eerste Divisie players
Eredivisie players
Footballers from North Holland